Ole Bremseth (born 2 January 1961) is a Norwegian former ski jumper.

Career
At the 1982 FIS Nordic World Ski Championships in Oslo, Bremseth won a bronze medal in the individual normal hill and a gold medal in the team large hill. He has six World Cup victories (all in 1982) with the first one in Lahti and the final one in Planica.

World Cup

Standings

Wins

External links 

1961 births
Living people
People from Øvre Eiker
Norwegian male ski jumpers
FIS Nordic World Ski Championships medalists in ski jumping
Sportspeople from Viken (county)
20th-century Norwegian people